Tezpur is a city and urban agglomeration in Sonitpur district, Assam state, India.

Tourism 
Tezpur has several tourist attractions:

 Agnigarh: This hillock located on the bank of the Brahmaputra river is the site of the legendary romance between Princess Usha, the only daughter of King Banasura, and Aniruddha, the grandson of Lord Krishna. According to legend, Usha was kept on this hillock which was surrounded by fire, hence the name "Agnigarh," which means "hill of fire" in Sanskrit.
 Mahabhairav Temple: The ancient Mahabhairav Temple is located north of the city of Tezpur. According to legend, it was established by King Bana and originally contained a Siva lingam. The temple was originally constructed of stone, but the current structure is made of concrete. In later years, the Ahom kings donated land and appointed priests and attendants to maintain the temple.
 Chitralekha Udyan (Cole Park): Chitralekha Udyan is a beautiful park established in 1906 by British Deputy Commissioner Mr. Cole. It features two massive ornamented stone pillars and other sculptural remnants, and was renovated and revitalized in 1996 under the leadership of Deputy Commissioner Mr. M.G.V.K.Bhanu. The park offers water sports facilities, walkways, a restaurant, and an open-air stage.
 Padum Pukhuri: This beautiful lake features an island that has been developed into a park with a musical fountain. The island is accessible via an iron bridge, and visitors can also go boating on the lake.
 Trimurty Udyan: Located along Borpukhuri, this park is named after three important figures in Assamese culture: Rupkowar Jyoti Prasad Agarwalla, Kalaguru Bishnu Prasad Rabha, and Natasurjya Phani Sarmah.
 Rudrapada Temple: Located on the east side of Tezpur and on the bank of the Brahmaputra river, the Rudrapada Temple is believed to be the site where Rudra (Lord Shiva) left the print of his left foot on a stone. According to legend, Mahadeva revealed his true self to King Bana at this location. The temple was built in 1730 by Siva Singha, but the main temple was later destroyed due to erosion by the Brahmaputra river.
 Bhomoraguri: It is a mammoth stone inscription made by the Ahom General Kalia Bhomora Borphukan, who planned to construct a bridge over Brahmaputra. Almost two centuries later, a bridge at the same site now stands completed. The 3.015 km bridge, named after the great Ahom general, connects Silghat of Nagaon district with Tezpur.
 Bamuni Hills: The ruins of the Bamuni Hills are known for their exceptional artistic finesse and feature sculptural remains dating back to the 9th and 10th centuries AD.
 Hazara Pukhuri: This large tank in Tezpur is named after Harjar Varman and was excavated in the early 9th century.

Climate 

Demography 

According to the 2011 census, the population of the Tezpur city Municipal Corporation area is 102,505. Of these, 40,837 people speak Assamese, 18,696 speak Bengali, 11,050 speak Hindi, and 31,920 speak other languages.

Government 
Tezpur is part of Tezpur (Lok Sabha constituency). Mr. Pallab Lochan Das is the current member of parliament for the Tezpur constituency.

Notable people 
Charles Alexander Bruce

Jyoti Prasad Agarwala
Bishnu Prasad Rabha
Phani Sarma
Ananda Chandra Agarwala
Hem Barua
 Nipon Goswami
 Chetana Das
 George Baker
 Somnath Chatterjee
 Tapan Deka
 Bijoy Chandra Bhagavati
 Dipak Jain
 Rajesh Borah

See also
 Jamugurihat
 Northeast India
 North Eastern Council 
 Ministry for Development of North Eastern Region

References

External links 

 
 Sonitpur District

 
Cities and towns in Sonitpur district